Presidential elections were held in Colombia on 4 June 1978. The result was a victory for Julio César Turbay Ayala of the Liberal Party, who received 49.5% of the vote.

Results

References

Presidential elections in Colombia
1978 in Colombia
Colombia